The Hand That Rocks the Cradle is an American silent drama film released in 1917. It was written, produced and directed by the husband and wife team Phillips Smalley and Lois Weber, who also play the lead roles. It was made in Hollywood under the working title Is a Woman a Person?

The plot follows the careers of a husband and wife pair of activists campaigning for sex education and family planning.  The events in the film were largely inspired by the trial of Margaret Sanger.

The film was an unofficial sequel to Where Are My Children?, a 1916 film by the same team, and has been classified as a lost film. It was not a commercial success upon its release, and Weber later claimed to be unhappy with the finished product.

Cast

References

External links 
 
 
   The Hand That Rocks The Cradle -  Herald

1917 films
American silent feature films
1917 drama films
American black-and-white films
Films directed by Lois Weber
Universal Pictures films
Films directed by Phillips Smalley
Silent American drama films
1917 lost films
Lost drama films
1910s American films